Inner Mongolia University of Finance and Economics (内蒙古财经大学) is a university in Inner Mongolia, China under the authority of the Autonomous Region government.  It is located in Hohhot, the capital city of Inner Mongolia Autonomous Region. Established in 1960.

It was renamed from Inner Mongolia Finance and Economics College (内蒙古财经学院) on March 26, 2012.

External links 
  Official website
  Official website

Universities and colleges in Inner Mongolia
Business schools in China